Alfred M. Glossbrenner Mansion is a historic home located at Indianapolis, Indiana.  It was built about 1910, and is a -story, Jacobethan Revival style brick dwelling with limestone trim.  It has a porte cochere and sun porch with Tudor arched openings.  It features a multi-gabled roof, stone mullions, buttresses, and tall chimneys.  It was converted to medical offices in the 1950s.

It was listed on the National Register of Historic Places in 1982.

References

Houses on the National Register of Historic Places in Indiana
Tudor Revival architecture in Indiana
Houses completed in 1910
Houses in Indianapolis
National Register of Historic Places in Indianapolis